Horn Cable TV (HCTV) is a Somali news-based private television channel.

Overview
Founded in 2003, Horn Cable TV broadcasts in Somali from its headquarters in Hargeisa, 
the capital of Somaliland. The station also has studios in Mogadishu and London, 
among other areas.

Horn Cable TV is owned by Farhan Haji Ali, a Hargeisa-based Somali entrepreneur who is also the owner of the FAACO.

The station generates revenue from advertising.

Programs

Horn Cable TV broadcasts around-the-clock across Somaliland and Somalia. Through satellite, its transmissions also reach other parts of the continent, Europe, Asia, and areas in Australia. The station is also available as a live webstream.

HCTV's programming covers a wide range of genres. Among these are news and current affairs, business, politics, drama, music and religious programs.

Staff
Horn Cable Television has a staff of around 90 ground reporters, who are stationed throughout the Horn of Africa region and nearby areas. Around 60 journalists are based at the station's headquarters, with additional personnel of 7 in Mogadishu.

Mohamoud Sheikh Dalmar serves as a radio and television producer for the channel. Additionally, Hamdi Hussein is the Director of its Mogadishu branch.

Memberships
Horn Cable TV is  member of the National Union of Somali Journalists (NUSOJ).

See also 

 Xiddigaha Geeska

See also

Media of Somalia
Universal Television (Somalia)
Eastern Television Network
Somaliland National TV
Puntland TV and Radio

References

Television channels in Somaliland
Companies of Somaliland